Pennsylvania State Senate District 41 includes all of Armstrong County and Indiana County and parts of Jefferson County and Westmoreland County. It is currently represented by Republican Joe Pittman.

District profile
The district includes the following areas:

All of Armstrong County

All of Indiana County

Jefferson County:

Westmoreland County:

Senators

References

Government of Armstrong County, Pennsylvania
Government of Butler County, Pennsylvania
Government of Indiana County, Pennsylvania
Government of Westmoreland County, Pennsylvania
Pennsylvania Senate districts